Robert Grave was an Anglican priest in the last years of the sixteenth century.

Born in Kent, he was educated at Cambridge University. He was appointed Dean of Cork in 1590; Precentor of Limerick in 1591; Precentor of Christ Church Cathedral, Dublin in 1595; and Bishop of Ferns and Leighlin in July 1600. He and his family were drowned in Dublin Bay in October that year.

References

People from Kent
16th-century Anglican bishops in Ireland
Deans of Cork
Bishops of Ferns and Leighlin
1600 deaths
People of Elizabethan Ireland
Alumni of the University of Cambridge